Argirópolis or  (from Greek  "silver city" or "Plata city") is a proposed city conceived by Argentine statesman  Domingo Faustino Sarmiento as the capital of the Confederated States of Plata (Argentina, Paraguay and Uruguay). It is also the title of the book that outlines this proposal.

Proposal 

Sarmiento proposes Martin Garcia Island, at the junction of the Parana and Uruguay River, as the site for Argirópolis, which in turn would ultimately be a point of unity between the interior provinces of Argentina and the Estado Oriental (i.e.: Uruguay).

Sarmiento based his argument on the following points:
     
      The example of the United States, whose capital, Washington DC, does not depend on any state.
      Closing the entrance to the Parana and Uruguay would ensure that the provinces of Corrientes, Santa Fe and Entre Rios, Paraguay and the Republic of Uruguay would unite in their common interest in favor of the independence of the island of Martín García.
      The independence of the island from the United Provinces of the Río de la Plata, Uruguay, and Paraguay would make these three states equal in negotiations on the free navigability of rivers.
      By placing the capital in neutral territory, no preference is given to the rival cities of Buenos Aires and Montevideo.
      This could facilitate the island's return from its French occupiers.

Orthography
The 1850 edition tries to follow the Spanish orthography proposed by Sarmiento in 1843, and similar to that of Andrés Bello.
Still occasional slips into the RAE standard happen.
Later editions follow the common orthography.

References 

Works by Domingo Faustino Sarmiento
Proposed populated places
Argentine Civil War propaganda
1850 books
Islands of the Río de la Plata
Confederations
1850 in South America
South American political history